Hylomyrma balzani is an ant of the genus Hylomyrma native to Argentina, Brazil and Paraguay. It was described by Emery in 1894, where the first specimen of a worker was described.

References

External links

Myrmicinae
Hymenoptera of South America
Invertebrates of Paraguay
Hymenoptera of Brazil
Invertebrates of Argentina
Insects described in 1894